Aldama is a genus of flowering plants in the family Asteraceae.  The genus was originally described to include one (later two) species of subtribe Helianthinae that were characterized by having pales that tightly enclosed the cypselae (achenes) (see Feddema, 1971).  Recent molecular phylogenetic studies (Schilling and Panero 2011)  showed that these species are within a large group that were formerly classified in the genus Viguiera, and Aldama has been expanded to include a total of 118 species.  Aldama is characterized by having a perennial herbaceous habit, a pappus usually of awns and scales, and a multiseriate involucre.

References

Asteraceae genera
Heliantheae